Zora is a Kenyan soap opera drama television series, produced by TV Anchor Lulu Hassan's  Jiffy Pictures, that premiered March 22, 2021 until March 7, 2022,  airing weekdays at 7:30 PM EAT (UTC +03:00) on Citizen TV and also on the station's on-demand streaming platform, Viusasa.

Plot
The series puts focus on Zora, who is the titular character, her family including the husband, Fella and son, Simba. Difficulties both in their marriage, and in bringing up their son, are further complicated with the arrival of Madiba. Notwithstanding the scolding of her mother, the support of her best friend Nana gives Zora the power to overcome her problems, while the story line navigates a dramatic set of events.

Cast and characters
 Sarah Hassan, as Zora
 Blessing Lung'aho, as Madiba
 Robert Agengo, as Fella
 Brenda Mitchell, as Alma
 Jackie Matubia, as Nana
 Neema Sulubu, as Neema
 Quincy Rapando, as Kwame
 Eunice David, as Hamida
 Patrick Gatimu, as Oscar
 Joseph Gachanja, as Mzee Chibale
 Bridget Shighadi, as Yola

Reception
While hailed for its good production quality, and drawing diverse reactions from viewers, there is a consensus that the show is 'for more mature audiences' than its predecessor, Maria (TV series) was. The Media Council of Kenya has asked the show's producers to be more mindful of their scripting, especially when dealing with sensitive or traumatic subject matter, such as infertility and sexual abuse.

References

Swahili-language television shows
Kenyan television series
2021 Kenyan television series debuts
Kenyan television soap operas
2020s Kenyan television series
Citizen TV original programming